North Dakota Highway 53 (ND 53) is a  east–west state highway in the U.S. state of North Dakota. ND 53's western terminus is at U.S. Route 83 (US 83) in Max, and the eastern terminus is at US 52 southeast of Balfour.

History
ND 53 was created when ND 23 was realigned onto a new route to the south.

Major intersections

References

053
Transportation in McLean County, North Dakota
Transportation in McHenry County, North Dakota